Nadiya Bakes is an eight-part cookery series presented by Nadiya Hussain on British television. Hussain shares recipes for her most indulgent desserts.

Book
A tie-in cookery book was published by Michael Joseph in September 2020 to coincide with BBC series.

See also
The Chronicles of Nadiya
Nadiya's British Food Adventure
Nadiya's Family Favourites

References

External links
 BBC – Nadiya Bakes
 

2020 British television series debuts
2020 British television series endings
BBC Television shows
British cooking television shows
English-language television shows